Taseer A. Badar is an American entrepreneur, businessman and philanthropist. Badar is chairman and chief executive officer of ZT Corporate, Inc., as well as many other Altus Health and ZT Corporate entities.

Badar's companies have earned consecutive Texas A&M "Aggie 100" awards (2007–2017), Houston Business Journal's 40 Under 40 (2012), Ernst & Young Entrepreneur of the Year Award winner (2016). and The South Asian Chamber of Commerce (SACC) Businessperson of the Year Award (2018).

Early life and education 
The youngest of four siblings, Taseer Badar was born October 1, 1973 in Lahore, Pakistan, where he spent the first 10 months of his life before immigrating to Eau Claire, Wisconsin. His mother, Kausar, was a Nuclear Medicine Technologist Professor in Chemistry at VA Medical Center in her native home in Pakistan, and his father, Tanwir, was a Professional Engineer (PE) and Associate Professor at King’s College London in Strand, London.

In high school, he began a lawn mowing business. Later, at Texas A&M University, where he would earn his Bachelor of Business Administration in entrepreneurship and finance from the Mays School of Business, he ran a toner company that shipped to clients.

Career 
In 1996, Badar began his financial advisor career with Morgan Stanley Dean Witter & Co. in New York City, where he built strong relationships with his clients. During his time here, he quickly realized that he "didn't want CNBC to dictate [his] life," so he returned to Houston and began a retail brokerage firm and began working with physicians who needed help investing their money.

Badar took this opportunity after receiving advice from his sister, Dr. Tehmina Badar, a pulmonologist; brother-in-law Dr. Shahin Shirzadi, a neurologist; and his best friend Dr. Raza Pasha, an ENT surgeon. Thus began Altus Health.

In 2014, as CEO of Altus Health, Badar opened Altus House, the first in-patient hospice unit in Sugar Land, TX.

In 2014, sensing an opportunity to expand outside of healthcare, Badar ventured into Florida and purchased several dealerships, including for Mercedes, BMW, Toyota, Kia, and Mazda vehicles. This collection would soon become ZT Motors.

In 2020, Badar began a partnership with Swapnil Agarwal of Nitya Capital.

References 

1973 births
Living people
21st-century American businesspeople
American philanthropists
Morgan Stanley employees
Texas A&M University alumni
American people of Pakistani descent
Pakistani emigrants to the United States
Healthcare in Texas
American automobile salespeople